Cyclophragma is a genus of moths in the family Lasiocampidae. It was erected by Turner in 1911.

Species
Based on Lepidoptera and Some Other Life Forms:
Cyclophragma cyclomela (Lower, 1903) - Australia
Cyclophragma centralistrigata (Bethune-Baker, 1904) - Australia

External links

Lasiocampidae